Tibor Károlyi is the name of:
 Tibor Károlyi (chess player)
 Tibor Károlyi (politician)